Paul-Antoine is a French masculine given name. It may refer to:

 Paul Antoine Bien-Aimé, Minister of the Interior and Territorial Collectivity of Haiti
 Paul Antoine Dubois (1795-1871), French obstetrician
 Paul-Antoine Giguère (1910–1987), Canadian academic and chemist
 Paul-Antoine Léonard de Villefeix (born 1728), French Dominican priest
 Paul Antoine Fleuriot de Langle (1744–1787), French vicomte, académicien de marine, naval commander and explorer

See also 
 Paul (name)
 Antoine

French masculine given names
Compound given names